Don Mills (17 August 1926 – 1994) was an English professional footballer who played as an inside forward.

Career
Born in Maltby, Mills played for Maltby Main, Queens Park Rangers, Torquay United (initially on loan), Cardiff City and Leeds United.

References

1926 births
1994 deaths
English footballers
Maltby Main F.C. players
Queens Park Rangers F.C. players
Torquay United F.C. players
Cardiff City F.C. players
Leeds United F.C. players
English Football League players
Association football inside forwards